Chuprene Municipality is a frontier municipality (obshtina) in Vidin Province, Northwestern Bulgaria, located in the vicinity of the western parts of Stara Planina range in the so-called Fore-Balkan area. It is named after its administrative centre - the village of Chuprene. In the southwest, the municipality borders on Republic of Serbia.

Midzhur peak, the highest point of the western Balkan mountains, is located in the municipality almost on the very border with Serbia.

Settlements 

Chuprene Municipality includes the following 9 places all of them villages:

Demography 
The following table shows the change of the population during the last four decades.

Religion 
According to the latest Bulgarian census of 2011, the religious composition, among those who answered the optional question on religious identification, was the following:

An overwhelming majority of the population of Chuprene Municipality identify themselves as Christians. At the 2011 census, 82.5% of respondents identified as Orthodox Christians belonging to the Bulgarian Orthodox Church.

See also
Provinces of Bulgaria
Municipalities of Bulgaria
List of cities and towns in Bulgaria

References

External links
 Official website 

Municipalities of Vidin Province